Nitrincola nitratireducens is a gram-negative, rod-shaped and motile bacterium from the genus of Nitrincola which has been isolated from sediments from the Lonar Lake in India.

References

Oceanospirillales
Bacteria described in 2015